Colonel Sir Clement Molyneux Royds  (3 April 1842 – 28 January 1916) was a British soldier who was the Conservative Member of Parliament (MP) for Rochdale from 1895 to 1906.

He stood unsuccessfully in 1892, won the seat from the Liberals in 1895, held it in 1900, but lost it to them in the Liberal landslide of 1906. He was commanding officer of the Duke of Lancaster's Own Yeomanry and was then honorary colonel of the 2nd Battalion Lancashire Fusiliers.

References

Sources

Craig, F.W.S. British Parliamentary Election Results 1885-1918
Whitaker's Almanack, 1893 to 1910 editions
Portrait

Conservative Party (UK) MPs for English constituencies
Members of the Parliament of the United Kingdom for Rochdale
1842 births
1916 deaths
British Army officers
Knights Bachelor
Companions of the Order of the Bath
Imperial Yeomanry officers
Duke of Lancaster's Own Yeomanry officers
Lancashire Fusiliers officers
British Army personnel of the Second Boer War
Fellows of the Society of Antiquaries of London
Hulme Trust